Ale Narendra (21 August 1946 – 9 April 2014) was an Indian politician who was a member of the 13th and 14th Lok Sabha of India. He represented the Medak Lok Sabha in 1999 and Medak constituency in 2004. He was 3 time MLA from Himayatnagar Constituency in 1983, 1988, 1992. He was one of the biggest proponents for Telangana statehood. Ale Narendra and other individuals associated with the Rashtriya Swayamsevak Sangh (RSS).

Early life
He was born in Aliabad in Hyderabad, Hyderabad State to Ale Ramalingam and his wife Ale Pushpavati in a Hindu community. He has a younger brother, Ale Shyam, a pracharak in RSS.

Career
He was a member of Rashtriya Swayamsevak Sangh and later joined the political party Jan Sangh in 1962.

BJP

He later joined Bharatiya Janata Party after the dissolution of Jan Sangh.

He represented Himayatnagar assembly constituency thrice in 1983, 1994 and 1997. He was a strong support to the public and true leader. By his early age he was RSS acolyte and with all the public support he turned out to be a leader of that time.

He won as MP from Medak in 1999 and 2004 from Medak Lok Sabha constituency. He was the state minister of Rural Development in UPA I.

Founding Telangana Sadhana Samithi
In 2001 he quit BJP in protest against not granting statehood to Telangana and launched a party called Telangana Sadhana Samithi (TSS) for achieving Telangana state. He, later on, merged with TRS Telangana Rashtra Samithi before he was asked to resign due to corruption charges.

Member of Parliament
He was elected to Lok Sabha in 1999 from Medak Lok Sabha constituency and in 2004 from Medak Lok Sabha constituency.

TRS
He joined TRS after K. Chandrashekhar Rao wanted a united fight for the achievement of Telangana state. He won as MP from the party once. After being removed from TRS, he became a non-entity in the political arena.

Death
At the age of 67, he died after prolonged illness from paralysis and other ailments and died on 9 April 2014 at a private hospital in Hyderabad.

Positions held
 Minister of State, Rural Development UPA I - 2004
 Member of Parliament, Lok Sabha - 1999 and 2004
 Member of Legislative Assembly - 1983, 1987 and 1991

References

1946 births
2014 deaths
 People from Telangana
 Union Ministers from Telangana
 Telangana politicians
 Telangana Rashtra Samithi politicians
 Bharatiya Janata Party politicians from Telangana
India MPs 1999–2004
India MPs 2004–2009
 Lok Sabha members from Telangana
 People from Medak district